Marco van Hoogdalem (born 23 May 1972) is a retired Dutch football player who had the most success playing for FC Schalke 04 in Germany.

Honours
Schalke
DFB-Pokal: 2000–01, 2001–02
DFL-Ligapokal: 2005
UEFA Cup: 1996–97

References

External links
 

1972 births
Living people
Dutch footballers
Dutch expatriate footballers
RKC Waalwijk players
Roda JC Kerkrade players
FC Schalke 04 players
Bundesliga players
Eredivisie players
Expatriate footballers in Germany
Association football defenders
Dutch expatriate sportspeople in Germany
Footballers from Gorinchem